The 2003 Western Illinois Leathernecks football team represented Western Illinois University as a member of the Gateway Football Conference during the 2003 NCAA Division I-AA football season. They were led by fifth-year head coach Don Patterson and played their home games at Hanson Field. The Leathernecks finished the season with an 9–4 record overall and a 5–2 record in conference play. The team received an at-large bid to the NCAA Division I-AA Football Championship playoffs, where they defeated Montana in the first round and lost to Colgate in the second round. The team was ranked No. 6 in The Sports Network's postseason ranking of Division I-AA.

Schedule

References

Western Illinois
Western Illinois Leathernecks football seasons
Western Illinois Leathernecks football